GURPS Japan, full title GURPS Japan: Roleplaying in the World of the Shogunate (1st edition) or GURPS Japan: Beauty, Terror, and Adventure (2nd edition), is a sourcebook for GURPS, a role-playing game by Steve Jackson Games. The first edition was published in 1988.

Authors
Lee Gold is an author, editor, game designer, and filk musician. In 1975, Gold founded Alarums and Excursions, a monthly amateur press association for RPG writers. She has served as editor ever since. Alarums and Excursions won the Charles S. Roberts Award for Best Amateur Wargame Magazine in 1984, and the Origins Award for Best Amateur Game Periodical in 2000, 2001, and 2002. Gold designed the RPGs Land of the Rising Sun (1980) and Lands of Adventure (1983), published by Fantasy Games Unlimited. She also published Vikings for Iron Crown Enterprises. Gold was the sole author of the first edition of GURPS Japan.

Hunter Johnson is a freelance game designer, author, and translator. He has translated many game rules and websites from German for Mayfair Games. He authored, co-authored, or contributed to seven books for Steve Jackson Games, including GURPS Monsters and this second edition of GURPS Japan, and served for five years as the first coordinator of GURPS errata for the company. Johnson expanded and revised Gold's work into its second edition.

Contents
GURPS Japan is a GURPS rules supplement for adventuring in feudal Japan, including character creation rules.

Publication history
GURPS Japan: Roleplaying in the World of the Shogunate was written by Lee Gold, with art by Guy Burchak, and was published by Steve Jackson Games in 1988 as a 112-page book.

GURPS Japan: Beauty, Terror, and Adventure, the second edition of the book, now revised and expanded to 128 pages by Hunter Johnson, was published by Steve Jackson Games in November 1999, written by Gold and Johnson, with art by Burchak and Theo Black. This second edition is compatible with the third edition of the GURPS gaming system.

GURPS Japan was the first in the series of historical sourcebooks from Steve Jackson Games, and one of the smaller subgenre books published after the first broad genre GURPS books.

Reception
Strategicon convention manager and game critic Eric M. Aldrich I said in his review of the first edition:

In his favorable review of this second edition, Kenneth Hite says, "Sengoku and L5R RPG players and GMs can both get a lot out of this book," adding that "medieval Japan, broadly defined, is suddenly one of the most solidly playable milieux in gaming."

Reviews
 Casus Belli #84 (Dec 1994)

References

GURPS 1st/2nd edition
GURPS 3rd edition
Japan
Historical role-playing games
Martial arts role-playing games
Role-playing game supplements introduced in 1988